Conus terryni is a species of sea snail, a marine gastropod mollusk in the family Conidae, the cone snails and their allies.

Like all species within the genus Conus, these snails are predatory and venomous. They are capable of "stinging" humans, therefore live ones should be handled carefully or not at all.

Description
The size of the shell varies between 20 mm and 30 mm.

Distribution
This marine species occurs off the Philippines.

References

 Tenorio M.J. & Poppe G.T. (2004) Description of three deep-water species of Conus from the Central Philippines. (Gastropoda, Conidae). Visaya 1(1): 20–30

External links
 The Conus Biodiversity website
 

terryni
Gastropods described in 2004